This is a list of notable organizations that provide Six Sigma certification.

Professional associations

 American Society for Quality (ASQ)
 Chartered Quality Institute (CQI)
 Institute of Industrial and Systems Engineers (IISE)

University certification programs

References

Lists of organizations
Good practice